Erdington railway station is a railway station serving the Erdington area of Birmingham, England. It is situated on the Redditch/Bromsgrove–Birmingham New Street–Lichfield Cross-City Line. It has 2 platforms.

The station was opened in 1862 by the London, Midland and Scottish Railway (LMS) on Sheep Lane, later known as Station Road.

Pedestrian access is via Station Road. Platform 1 and 2 have separate entrances. Platform 1’s entrance being towards the car park and the second being past the tunnel on the other side. When you are in the station, there is no way to switch between platforms without coming out the station. The station is above road level, as the line here is on an embankment. A new passenger shelter on the northbound platform was built and opened in November 2006.

The letters LMS can still be seen on the adjacent road bridge. At the foot of the ramp to the southbound platform there is a sculpture by Ronald Rae entitled Insect and Celtic Cross.

Gallery

Services
The station is served by West Midlands Trains with local Transport for West Midlands branded "Cross-City" services, operated by Class 323 electrical multiple units.

Access for disabled passengers
There are ramps accessing both platforms at Erdington Station.

References

External links

Rail Around Birmingham and the West Midlands: Erdington railway station
Warwickshire Railways page

Erdington
Railway stations in Birmingham, West Midlands
DfT Category E stations
Former London and North Western Railway stations
Railway stations in Great Britain opened in 1862
Railway stations served by West Midlands Trains
1862 establishments in England